443 Maritime Helicopter Squadron is a Canadian Armed Forces helicopter squadron under the Royal Canadian Air Force (RCAF), located on Vancouver Island, British Columbia. It was originally a Second World War RCAF squadron that operated as part of RAF Fighter Command in Europe with the Supermarine Spitfire.

History

Formation and World War II
Originally formed as No. 127 (Fighter) Squadron in the fighter role in July 1942, it operated along the East Coast of Canada (Including RCAF Gander in Newfoundland) flying Hawker Hurricanes until late 1943, when it was selected for overseas service. Arriving in Britain on 8 February 1944, it was redesignated No. 443 Squadron at Bournemouth and was soon based at RAF Digby, Lincolnshire, together with Nos. 441 and 442 Squadrons as Article XV squadrons under the control of the British Royal Air Force.

Working up on Spitfire Mk. Vs from RAF Westhampnett, the squadron received Spitfire Mk. IXs the following month when a move was made to Holmesley South to form No. 144 Wing RAF, Second Tactical Air Force, and the squadron became operational. The first sorties were as bomber escorts and until the invasion in June the squadron carried out deep penetration missions using  drop tanks. During the Normandy landings themselves, the squadron provided low-level fighter cover and on 15 June it moved to France in the close-support and armed aerial reconnaissance role. It was now heavily involved in ground attack sorties and continued to move forward following the Allied advance through Belgium and into the Netherlands to maintain its close air support of the ground forces. Having returned to RAF Warmwell for an air-firing course the squadron missed the Luftwaffe's New Year's attack on Allied airfields. Unlike its two fellow squadrons, it did not return to Britain, but stayed on the continent, following the Allied armies advance into Germany equipped with the Spitfire Mk. XVI. With the end of the war the squadron joined the British Air Forces of Occupation until disbanding at Uetersen on 15 March 1946.

Post war
The squadron was re-formed on 12 September 1951 at RCAF Station Sea Island (Vancouver) and became New Westminster (Vancouver) Auxiliary Squadron. Aircraft flown include the North American P-51 Mustang, Harvard, and Expeditor. The squadron again disbanded on 31 March 1964.

No. 443 was reactivated again on 25 October 1974 as 443 Anti-Submarine Helicopter Squadron at CFB Shearwater, Nova Scotia. In the late 1980s, the squadron moved to Patricia Bay on Vancouver Island. In 1995 the squadron changed its name to 443 Maritime Helicopter Squadron.  It flew the CH-124 Sea King helicopter in support of Royal Canadian Navy (RCN) warships in the Arabian Sea after the 11 September 2001 terrorist attacks. The squadron currently operates three CH-148 Cyclone helicopters.

Aircraft operated

References

Notes

Bibliography

 Flintham, Vic and Andrew Thomas. Combat Codes: A full explanation and listing of British, Commonwealth and Allied air force unit codes since 1938. Shrewsbury, Shropshire, UK: Airlife Publishing, 2003. .
 Halley, James J. The Squadrons of the Royal Air Force. Tonbridge, Kent, UK: Air-Britain (Historians) Ltd., 1980. .
 Halley, James J. The Squadrons of the Royal Air Force & Commonwealth 1918–1988. Tonbridge, Kent, UK: Air Britain (Historians) Ltd., 1988. .
 Jefford, C.G. RAF Squadrons, a Comprehensive record of the Movement and Equipment of all RAF Squadrons and their Antecedents since 1912. Shrewsbury, Shropshire, UK: Airlife Publishing, 1988 (second edition 2001). .
 Rawlings, John. Fighter Squadrons of the RAF and their Aircraft. London: Macdonald and Jane's Publishers Ltd., 1969 (second edition 1976). .

Canadian Department of National Defence – Honours & Recognition for the Men and Women of the Canadian Armed Forces 10th Edition – 2016. Accessed 14 March 2019

External links

 
 DND – Squadron History
 World War II Squadron history
 RCAF.com – No. 443 Squadron

Canadian Forces aircraft squadrons
Royal Canadian Air Force squadrons